The Aracruz school shootings were a shooting spree that occurred on November 25, 2022, at two schools in Aracruz, Espírito Santo, Brazil. Four people were killed, and 12 others were injured. The suspect, Gabriel Rodrigues Castiglioni, a 16-year-old former student at one of the schools, was arrested approximately four hours later.

Shootings 
The shootings began at around 9:30 a.m. and occurred at two schools located on the same street. The gunman, who wore camouflaged clothing, an armband with a swastika, a skull mask, and a hood, broke into the Primo Bitti Elementary and Middle School, a public school serving elementary and middle school students, after destroying a lock. There, he shot 11 people, killing two teachers. A third teacher died a day later.

Afterwards, the gunman returned to a car owned by his father and drove to the Educational Center Praia de Coqueiral, a private school. Entering at 9:49 a.m. through the unlocked gates, he shot an additional three people, killing a female 6th-grade student. The gunman fled again a minute later and remained at large for approximately 4 hours. Later, the Military Police released a statement confirming that a suspect was in custody.

Victims 
The victims of the attacks were identified by multiple news sources:

 Selena Zagrillo, 12
 Maria da Penha Pereira de Melo Banhos, 48 
 Cybelle Passos Bezerra Lara, 45
 Flavia Amoss Merçon Leonardo, 38

Aftermath and reactions 
After the shootings, Aracruz announced the suspension of all classes at municipal schools.

The Aracruz mayor said this was "the largest tragedy this city has ever seen". Renato Casagrande, the governor of Espírito Santo, said he would pay attention to the case with "much regret and sadness". He also declared three days of official mourning in the state. President-elect Luiz Inácio Lula da Silva posted on Twitter, "My solidarity to the families of the victims in this absurd tragedy."

References

2022 mass shootings in South America
Espírito Santo
Filmed killings
Mass shootings in Brazil
November 2022 crimes
November 2022 events in Brazil
School shootings in Brazil
Spree shootings in South America